Super B may refer to:
 Super B (TV channel)
 Super B (film)